Somerset Lake is a small lake located north-northwest of Lordville in Delaware County, New York. It drains southwest via Humphries Brook, which flows into the Delaware River. Black Ash Swamp is located southwest of Somerset Lake.

See also
 List of lakes in New York

References 

Lakes of New York (state)
Lakes of Delaware County, New York